Phascolionidae is a family of peanut worms.

Species

Onchnesoma
 Onchnesoma intermedium Murina 1976
 Onchnesoma magnibathum Cutler 1969
 Onchnesoma squamatum (Koren and Danielssen, 1875)
 Onchnesoma steenstrupii Koren & Danielssen 1875

Phascolion
 Phascolion abnorme Fischer 1895
 Phascolion bogorovi Murina 1973
 Phascolion caupo Hendrix 1975
 Phascolion cirratum Murina, 1968
 Phascolion collare Selenka and de Man, 1883
 Phascolion convestitum Sluiter, 1902
 Phascolion cryptum Hendrix, 1975
 Phascolion gerardi Rice, 1993
 Phascolion hedraeum Selenka and de Man, 1883
 Phascolion hibridum Murina 1981
 Phascolion hupferi Fischer, 1895
 Phascolion lucifugax Selenka and de Man, 1883
 Phascolion lutense Selenka, 1885
 Phascolion medusae Cutler and Cuttler, 1980
 Phascolion megaethi Cutler & Cutler 1979
 Phascolion microspheroidis Cutler and Duffy, 1972
 Phascolion pacificum Murina, 1957
 Phascolion pharetratum Sluiter 1902
 Phascolion psammophilus Rice 1993
 Phascolion rectum Ikeda, 1904
 Phascolion robertsoni Stephen & Robertson 1952
 Phascolion strombus (Montagu, 1804)
 Phascolion tuberculosum Théel, 1875
 Phascolion ushakovi Murina 1974
 Phascolion valdiviae Fischer, 1916

References

Sipunculans
Annelid families